Sania Maskatiya is a Pakistani fashion designer. Her clothing line is called Sania Studio, which was featured in the 2018 edition of New York Fashion Week. She has won many LUX Style Awards for Achievement in Fashion Design. A textile design graduate of the prestigious Indus Valley School of Art and Architecture in Karachi, Pakistan, Sania Maskatiya joined hands with business partner and director, Umair Tabani, in 2010 to creative a distinctive fashion label that captured the fashion industry by storm. Her brand is known for including rich textiles, fabric design and embroidery within its pieces. Through the success of her brand, Sania Makatiya became one of Pakistan's renowned fashion designers and exports, with branches all over Pakistan, and in Dubai, Singapore, The United States, Canada, and the United Kingdom.

References 

Pakistani fashion designers
Pakistani women fashion designers
Living people
Year of birth missing (living people)